Carol Christine Fair (born 1968) is an American political scientist. She is an associate professor in the Security Studies Program within the Edmund A. Walsh School of Foreign Service at Georgetown University. Her work is primarily focused on counter-terrorism and South Asian topics.

Academic career 
Fair received her PhD from the Department of South Asian Languages and Civilization at the University of Chicago in 2004. Previously, she received a masters of arts and Bachelor of Science from the same university.

Fair served as a senior political scientist with the RAND Corporation, political officer with the UN Assistance Mission to Afghanistan, and a senior research associate with the United States Institute of Peace. She specializes in political and military affairs in South Asia. She has served as a senior fellow at West Point's Combating Terrorism Center, a senior resident fellow at the Institute of Defense Studies and Analyses (New Delhi), and took a Reagan–Fascell Democracy Fellowship in the spring of 2017.

Fair is a Provost's Distinguished Associate Professor in the Peace and Security Studies Program (SSP) within Georgetown University's Edmund A. Walsh School of Foreign Service.
She has  authored or co-authored, and co-edited several books, including Pakistan's Enduring Challenges (University of Pennsylvania Press, 2015), Policing Insurgencies: Cops as Counterinsurgents (Oxford University Press, 2014);Political Islam and Governance in Bangladesh (Routledge, 2010); Treading on Hallowed Ground: Counterinsurgency Operations in Sacred Spaces (Oxford University Press, 2008); The Madrassah Challenge: Militancy and Religious Education in Pakistan (USIP, 2008), and Cuisines of the Axis of Evil and Other Irritating States (Globe Pequot, 2008), Fighting to the End: The Pakistan Army’s Way of War (Oxford University Press, 2014), In Their Own Words: Understanding the Lashkar-e-Tayyaba (Oxford University Press, 2019), among others. Her current book project is Militant Piety and Lines of Control.

Views
Fair has published several articles defending the use of drone strikes in Pakistan and has been critical of analyses by Human Rights Watch, Amnesty International, and other humanitarian organizations, arguing that drone strikes are accurate, have reduced casualties, have targeted Taliban leadership, and are popular among some Pakistanis.

Academic controversies 
Fair's work and viewpoints have been the subject of criticism.  In 2015, journalist Glenn Greenwald dismissed Fair's arguments in support of drone strikes as "rank propaganda", arguing there are "enormous amounts of evidence" showing drones are counterproductive, pointing to mass civilian casualties and independent studies.  Commenting on her debate with Greenwald,  Brookings Institution senior fellow Shadi Hamid called Fair's arguments "surprisingly weak".  In 2010, Fair denied the notion that drones caused any civilian deaths, alleging Pakistani media reports were responsible for creating this perception. Jeremy Scahill wrote that Fair's statement was "simply false" and contradicted by New America's detailed study on drone casualties. Fair later said that casualties are caused by the UAVs, but maintains they are the most effective tool for fighting terrorism.

Writing for The Atlantic, Conor Friedersdorf challenged Fair's co-authored narrative that the U.S. could legitimize support in Pakistan for its drone program using 'education' and 'public diplomacy'; he called it an "example of interventionist hubris and naivete" built upon flawed interpretation of public opinion data. An article in the Middle East Research and Information Project called the work "some of the most propagandistic writing in support of President Barack Obama’s targeted kill lists to date." It censured the view that Pakistanis needed to be informed by the U.S. what is "good for them" as fraught with imperialist condescension; or the assumption that the Urdu press was less informed than the English press – because the latter was sometimes less critical of the U.S.

Fair's journalistic sources have been questioned for their credibility and she has been accused of having a conflict of interest due to her past work with U.S. government think tanks, as well as the CIA. In 2011 and 2012, she received funding from the U.S. embassy in Islamabad to conduct a survey on public opinion concerning militancy. However, Fair states most of the grants went to a survey firm and that it had no influence on her research. Pakistani media analysts have dismissed Fair's views as hawkish rhetoric, riddled with factual inaccuracies, lack of objectivity, and being selectively biased. She has been accused by the Pakistani government of double standards, partisanship towards India, and has been criticized for her contacts with dissident leaders from Balochistan, a link which they claim "raises serious questions if her interest in Pakistan is merely academic."

Personal controversies 
In January 2017, Fair was involved in a Twitter dispute with Asra Q. Nomani. In response to Nomani's tweet that as a Muslim, she voted for President Trump, Fair tweeted that she had "written [Nomani] off as a human being" and that Nomani had "pimped herself out to all media outlets." Nomani responded by filing a complaint with Georgetown University, Fair's employer, alleging discrimination and harassment.

In May 2017, Fair began an altercation with white nationalist Richard B. Spencer at a gym in Alexandria, Virginia. While the two were working out, Fair approached Spencer and accused him of being a Nazi, along with a number of other accusations, leading a third gym patron to intervene on behalf of him. This incident resulted in Spencer's membership being terminated by the manager of the gym.

In January 2018, Fair was involved in an incident at Frankfurt Airport in Germany. When her bag was flagged for possibly containing explosives, it was searched and German Federal Police instructed Fair that she would have to dispose of a liquid deodorant or transfer it to her checked bag. German police stated that Fair was uncooperative, that she accused them of sexism and of being Nazis and thugs, and directed expletives at them. Fair was charged with slander under Germany's defamation law. She subsequently published an article on HuffPost partially rejecting the police account of the incident.

In the midst of the Brett Kavanaugh Supreme Court nomination hearings in September 2018, Fair tweeted that Republican members of the Senate Judiciary Committee were "entitled white men justifying a serial rapists' arrogated entitlement" and that they "deserve miserable deaths while feminists laugh as they take their last gasps." She made additional comments expressing support for post-mortem castration and corpse desecration of the senators. At least one student expressed the fear that Fair's comments would cause students who hold opposing views to feel threatened. Georgetown University responded by saying that her expressions did not violate the university's policies. The university later responded by moving up her scheduled international research leave.

Fair has accused the historian Dipesh Chakrabarty of sexual harassment.

Fair also charged historian Rochona Majumder for sexual exploitation and plagiarism. Upon being sued and subsequent defeat in the lawsuit; Fair issued an unconditional public apology for the vilification and retracted her malafide statements issued in this regard.

Works
 Books
 Cuisines of the Axis of Evil and Other Irritating States: A Dinner Party Approach to International Relations (The Lyons Press, 2008). .
 Fighting to the End: The Pakistan Army's Way of War (Oxford University Press, 2014). .
 In Their Own Words: Understanding Lashkar-e-Tayyaba (Oxford University Press, 2019).

 Edited collections
 Treading on Hallowed Ground: Counterinsurgency Operations in Sacred Spaces (with Sumit Ganguly, Oxford University Press, 2008). .
 Islam and Governance in Bangladesh (with Ali Riaz, Routledge, 2010). .
 Pakistan in National and Regional Change: State and Society in Flux (with Shaun Gregory, Routledge, 2013). .

 Research reports
 Limited Conflicts Under the Nuclear Umbrella: Indian and Pakistani Lessons from the Kargil Crisis (with Ashley J. Tellis and Jamison Jo Medby, RAND, 2002). .
 The Counterterror Coalitions: Cooperation with Pakistan and India (RAND, 2004). .
 Urban Battle Fields of South Asia: Lessons Learned from Sri Lanka, India, and Pakistan (RAND, 2005). .
 Fortifying Pakistan: The Role of U.S. Internal Security Assistance (with Peter Chalk, US Institute of Peace Press, 2006). .
 The Madrassah Challenge: Militancy and Religious Education in Pakistan (US Institute of Peace Press, 2008). .
 Counterinsurgency in Pakistan (with Seth G. Jones, RAND 2010). .

References

External links
 Personal web page
 Georgetown University
 The RAND Corporation
 Carnegie Endowment for International Peace
 After bin Laden, Still No Choice for U.S. with Pakistan, Q&A with C. Christine Fair about U.S.–Pakistan relations (May 2011)
 

1969 births
Living people
American women political scientists
American political scientists
Walsh School of Foreign Service faculty
American scholars of Pakistan studies
Writers about Pakistan
American political writers
Women political writers
21st-century American women writers
American cookbook writers
Women cookbook writers
American women non-fiction writers
21st-century American non-fiction writers
American women academics